Calliostoma fascinans is a species of sea snail, a marine gastropod mollusk in the family Calliostomatidae.

Description
The height of the shell attains 12 mm.

Distribution
This species occurs in the Gulf of Mexico at depths between 68 m and 126 m.

References

 Schwengel, J. S. and T. L. McGinty. 1942. Some new and interesting marine shells from northwest Florida. Nautilus 56: 13–18, pl. 3
 Rosenberg, G., F. Moretzsohn, and E. F. García. 2009. Gastropoda (Mollusca) of the Gulf of Mexico, Pp. 579–699 in Felder, D.L. and D.K. Camp (eds.), Gulf of Mexico–Origins, Waters, and Biota. Biodiversity. Texas A&M Press, College Station, Texas.

fascinans
Gastropods described in 1942